Ad infinitum is a Latin phrase meaning "to infinity" or "forevermore".

Description
In context, it usually means "continue forever, without limit" and this can be used to describe a non-terminating process, a non-terminating repeating process, or a set of instructions to be repeated "forever," among other uses. It may also be used in a manner similar to the Latin phrase et cetera to denote written words or a concept that continues for a lengthy period beyond what is shown. Examples include:
 "The sequence 1, 2, 3, ... continues ad infinitum."
 "The perimeter of a fractal may be iteratively drawn ad infinitum."
The 17th-century writer Jonathan Swift incorporated the idea of self-similarity in the following lines from his satirical poem On Poetry: a Rhapsody (1733):
The vermin only teaze and pinch
Their foes superior by an inch.
So, naturalists observe, a flea
Has smaller fleas that on him prey;
And these have smaller still to bite 'em,
And so proceed ad infinitum.
Thus every poet, in his kind,
Is bit by him that comes behindThe mathematician Augustus De Morgan included similar lines in his rhyme Siphonaptera.

See also
 Mathematical induction
 Recursion
 Self-reference
 "The Song That Never Ends"
 Turtles all the way down

References

External links
 
__notoc__

Infinity
Latin logical phrases
Latin words and phrases